Robert Wayne Holcombe (born December 11, 1975) is a former American football fullback who played for the St. Louis Rams and Tennessee Titans of the National Football League (NFL).

College
Holcombe played running back at Illinois, where he was the school’s all-time leading rusher with 4,105 yards.

NFL career

St. Louis Rams
Holcombe was drafted in the second round of the 1998 NFL Draft by the St. Louis Rams. He started at fullback for the 1999 Super Bowl Championship team. Holcombe’s role with the Rams diminished with the emergence of undrafted James Hodgins into the starting fullback role.
Holcombe played four seasons for the Rams alongside of NFL MVP, Super Bowl MVP Kurt Warner and NFL MVP Marshall Faulk.

Tennessee Titans
Holcombe went to the Tennessee Titans after the 2001 season. He played both halfback and fullback for three seasons in the backfield with NFL MVP Steve McNair and Heisman Trophy winner Eddie George.
After the 2004 season the Titans released Holcombe along with Derrick Mason, Samari Rolle, and the departure of Steve McNair.

The Chiefs quickly signed him but he was placed on IR (injured reserve) after suffering a preseason knee injury before the 2005 season begun.

NFL career statistics

References

1975 births
Living people
Players of American football from Houston
American football fullbacks
Illinois Fighting Illini football players
St. Louis Rams players
Tennessee Titans players
Kansas City Chiefs players
Mesa High School alumni